Andrzej Zaniewski (born April 13, 1939) is a Polish poet, prose writer and songwriter.

Early life and career 
Andrzej Zaniewski was born on April 13, 1939 in Warsaw, Poland. Zaniewski completed his studies of art history at the University of Warsaw in 1964. His first poems were published in the :pl:Głos Wybrzeża newspaper, in 1958. He is one of the creators of the Hybrydy poetry group. He is the author of numerous books of poetry and prose translated into more than 30 languages, including the famous novel (written from the point of view of a rat) Szczur published in English under the title Rat (1994), published by Arcade Publishing in a translation by Ewa Hryniewicz-Yarbrough.

Honors  
 2002:  Appointed Officer of the Order of Polonia Restituta by the Polish government

References

Polish writers
Polish novelists
Polish poets
Writers from Warsaw
1939 births

Living people